Gaby's Deli was a family Jewish  restaurant in London's Charing Cross Road. It was named after the founder, Gaby Elyahou, who ran it with his family.

It served fresh salads and homely hot meals such as goulash.  It was especially noted for the quality of its salt beef and falafel.

It was threatened by closure in 2011 but a campaign by its many celebrity customers, including prominent actors and politicians, persuaded the landlord, Lord Salisbury, to grant a further lease. It closed at the end of October 2018, following the owner's retirement.

Ownership
It was founded in 1965 by an Iraqi refugee, Gaby Elyahou, who took over an existing salt beef bar. The landlord was Lord Salisbury whose property company, Gascoyne Holdings, threatened to close the business by not extending the lease in 2011.  Celebrities from theatre and politics campaigned to save it and these included Boris Johnson, Jeremy Corbyn, Miriam Margolyes and Vanessa Redgrave. Gaby retired in 2018 and his nephew Menachem Kojman, who helped him run the deli after he closed his own restaurant, decided that the deli could no longer compete against fast food chains and would close in October 2018.

Clientele
The Jewish deli was popular with theatrical celebrities because it was in London's Theatreland district and it served quick and tasty meals.  Charlie Chaplin was a regular customer and other stars commemorated by photographs inside the restaurant included Diana Rigg and Matt Damon. The restaurant was also popular with left-wing politicians such as Ken Livingstone and Jeremy Corbyn.

Cuisine
The restaurant already served salt beef when Gaby took over and he thought this made the best sandwich. He introduced espresso coffee and many varieties of salad. Mediterranean dishes such as hummus and tahini were served and Gaby claimed to have introduced falafels to London. Other dishes included goulash, meatballs and soup.

Reception

Matthew Norman reviewed the restaurant for The Daily Telegraph, giving it a rating of 9 out of 10.  The dishes which he praised included bean and barley soup, chicken livers fried with onions, and a spinach salad.  His party then ordered more food and he especially praised the salt beef:

Closure

The restaurant closed at 8.30pm on 31 October 2018.  Regulars who came for a final meal included Labour MP, Barbara Roche, who had been eating there with her family since she was sixteen.

See also
 List of Jewish delicatessens
 List of restaurants in London

References

1965 establishments in England
2018 disestablishments in England
Charing Cross Road
Iraqi-Jewish diaspora
Jewish delicatessens in the United Kingdom
Defunct restaurants in London
Mizrahi Jewish cuisine
Restaurants in London
Defunct Jewish delicatessens